The Taguig River is a river in the Philippines, a tributary of the Pasig River, eventually joining the Pateros River, forming the common border between Pateros and Makati. The river is also between the streets of Makati, Pateros, Taguig, and Pasig, forming dead ends along the streets.

See also
 List of rivers and esteros in Manila
 Taguig

External links
Official Website of Taguig City

Rivers of Metro Manila